Amos Grodzinowsky (also "Grodzinowsky" and "Grozhinowski"; עמוס גרודז'ינובסקי; born June 3, 1940) is an Israeli former Olympic runner. He was the Israeli Men's Champion in the 100 metres in 1960, and in the 200 metres in 1962 and 1963.

He was born in Tel Aviv, Israel.

Running career
His personal bests were 21.97 in the 200 metres (in 1960); and  48.1 in the 400 metres (in 1966). He was the Israeli Men's Champion in the 100 metres in 1960, and in the 200 metres in 1962 and 1963.

He competed for Israel at the 1960 Summer Olympics in Rome, Italy, at the age of 20 in Athletics.  In the Men's 100 metres he came in 6th in Heat 1 with a time of 11.1, in the Men's 200 metres he came in 4th in Heat 9 with a time of 21.8, and in the Men's 400 metres he came in 6th in Heat 9 with a time of 48.9. When he competed in the Olympics, he was 5-8.5 (174 cm) tall, and weighed 143 lbs (65 kg).

References 

Living people
Athletes (track and field) at the 1960 Summer Olympics
1940 births
Olympic athletes of Israel
Sportspeople from Tel Aviv
Israeli male sprinters